Sound Mountain Sessions is the second EP by American rock band Lynch Mob, and second record after the return of the original vocalist Oni Logan. Bassist Marco Mendoza left the band in tour and Robbie Crane (ex-Ratt) filled the spot. This is the first record of the band with the Rat Pak Records label.

Track listing

Personnel
Oni Logan – vocals
George Lynch – guitars
Robbie Crane – bass, backing vocals
Scot Coogan – drums, backing vocals

References

Lynch Mob (band) albums
2012 EPs